The Bentley 4½ Litre is a British car based on a rolling chassis built by Bentley Motors. A racing variant was known as the Blower Bentley.

Bentley buyers used their cars for personal transport and arranged for their new chassis to be fitted with various body styles, mostly saloons or tourers. However, the publicity brought by their competition programme was invaluable for marketing Bentley's cars.

At the time, noted car manufacturers such as Bugatti and Lorraine-Dietrich focused on designing cars to compete in the 24 Hours of Le Mans, a popular automotive endurance course established only a few years earlier. A victory in this competition quickly elevated any car maker's reputation.

A total of 720 4½ Litre cars were produced between 1927 and 1931, including 55 cars with a supercharged engine popularly known as the Blower Bentley. A 4½ Litre Bentley won the 24 Hours of Le Mans in 1928.

Background and development

Bentley at the 24 Hours of Le Mans
The 24 Hours of Le Mans endurance race is a 24-hour race around the Circuit de la Sarthe. The inaugural race was held 26–27 May 1923, and attracted many drivers, mostly French. There were two foreign competitors in the first race, Frank Clement and Canadian John Duff, the latter winning the 1924 competition in his personal car, a Bentley 3 Litre.

"Made with precision and the finest material," and with recent success, the luxurious Bentley cars attracted attention. After two years without success, Bentley convened a group of wealthy British men, "united by their love of insouciance, elegant tailoring, and a need for speed," to renew Bentley's success. Both drivers and mechanics, these men, later nicknamed the "Bentley Boys", drove Bentley automobiles to victory in several races between 1927 and 1931, including four consecutive wins at the 24 Hours of Le Mans, and forged the brand's reputation.

It was within this context that, in 1927, Bentley developed the Bentley 4½ Litre. Two cylinders were removed from the 6½ Litre model, reducing the displacement to 4.4 litres. At the time, the 3 Litre and the 6½ Litre were already available, but the 3 Litre was an outdated, under-powered model and the 6½ Litre's image was tarnished by poor tyre performance.

Tim Birkin and the Blower Bentley

Sir Henry "Tim" Birkin, described as "the greatest British driver of his day" by W. O. Bentley, was one of the Bentley Boys. He refused to adhere strictly to Bentley's assertion that increasing displacement is always preferable to forced induction. Birkin, aided by a former Bentley mechanic, decided to produce a series of five supercharged models for the competition at the 24 Hours of Le Mans; Mercedes-Benz had been using superchargers for years.

Thus the 4½ litre Blower Bentley was born. The first supercharged Bentley had been a 3-litre FR5189 which had been supercharged at the Cricklewood factory in the winter of 1926/7.  The Bentley Blower No.1 was officially presented in 1929 at the British International Motor Show at Olympia, London. The 55 copies were built to comply with 24 Hours of Le Mans regulations. Birkin arranged for the construction of the supercharged cars having received approval from Bentley chairman and majority shareholder Woolf Barnato and financing from wealthy horse racing enthusiast Dorothy Paget. Development and construction of the supercharged Bentleys was done in a workshop in Welwyn Garden City by Amherst Villiers, who also provided the superchargers.

W.O. Bentley was hostile to forced induction and believed that "to supercharge a Bentley engine was to pervert its design and corrupt its performance." However, having lost control of the company he founded to Barnato, he could not halt Birkin's project.

Specifications

The manual transmission, however, required skill, as its four gears were unsynchronised.

The robustness of the 4½ Litre's lattice chassis, made of steel and reinforced with ties, was needed to support the heavy cast iron inline-four engine.

The engine was "resolutely modern" for the time. The displacement was :  bore and  stroke. Two SU carburetters and dual ignition with Bosch magnetos were fitted. The engine speed was limited to 4,000 rpm. A single, crossflow, overhead camshaft actuated four valves per cylinder, inclined at 30 degrees. This was a technically advanced design at a time where most cars used only two valves per cylinder in a side-valve cylinder head. The camshaft was driven by bevel gears on a vertical shaft at the front of the engine, as on the 3 Litre engine.

The Bentley's tanks - radiator, oil and petrol - had quick release filler caps that opened with one stroke of a lever. This saved time during pit stops.

This 4½ was equipped with a canvas top stretched over a lightweight Weymann body. The hood structure was very light but with high wind resistance (24 Hours Le Mans rules between 1924 and 1928 dictated a certain number of laps for which the hood had to be closed).

Brakes were conventional, consisting of  drum brakes finned for improved cooling and operated by rod. Semi-elliptic leaf springs were used at front and rear.

Blower Bentley 

The essential difference between the Bentley 4½ Litre and the Blower was the addition of a Roots-type supercharger to the Blower engine by engineer Amherst Villiers, who had also produced the supercharger. W. O. Bentley, as chief engineer of the company he had founded, refused to allow the engine to be modified to incorporate the supercharger. As a result, the supercharger was placed at the end of the crankshaft, in front of the radiator. This gave the Blower Bentley an easily recognisable appearance and also increased the car's understeer due to the additional weight at the front. A guard protected the two carburetters located at the compressor intake. Similar protection was used, both in the 4½ Litre and the Blower, for the fuel tank at the rear, because a flying stone punctured the 3 Litre of Frank Clement and John Duff during the first 24 Hours of Le Mans, which contributed to their defeat.

The crankshaft, pistons and lubrication system were special to the Blower engine.

In 2019–2020, Bentley scanned all 630 components that made up the Blower so that they could digitally re-create it and create 12 new models. In December 2020, Bentley Blower Car Zero, the first example of the Blower Continuation Series was presented. The car was built in Crewe according to the historic specifications and based on the production processes of that period.

Competition performance

Between 1927 and 1931 the Bentley 4½ Litre competed in several competitions, primarily the 24 Hours of Le Mans. The first was the Old Mother Gun at the 1927 24 Hours of Le Mans, driven as a prototype before production. Favored to win, it instead crashed and did not finish. Its performance was sufficient for Bentley to decide to start production and deliver the first models the same year.

The next year, three 4½ Litres finished second, third, and fourth behind another Bentley, the Speed Six, which possessed two more cylinders.

The naturally aspirated 4½ Litre was noted for its good reliability. The supercharged models were not; the two Blower models entered in the 1930 24 Hours of Le Mans by Dorothy Paget, one of which was co-driven by Tim Birkin, did not complete the race. In 1930, Birkin finished second in the French Grand Prix at the Circuit de Pau behind a Bugatti Type 35. Ettore Bugatti, annoyed by the performance of Bentley, called the 4½ Litre the "fastest lorry in the world." The Type 35 is much lighter and consumes much less petrol. Blower Bentleys consume 4 liters per minute at full speed.

In 1930, the Daily Herald offered a trophy for the fastest driver at an event at Brooklands. In 1932, Tim Birkin won driving his red Blower "Monoposto," clocking .

End of production

In November 1931, after selling 720 copies of the 4½ Litre - 655 naturally aspirated and 55 supercharged - in three different models (Tourer, Drophead Coupé and Sporting Four Seater), Bentley was forced to sell his company to Rolls-Royce for £125,175, a victim of the recession that hit Europe following the Wall Street Crash of 1929.

Current status

, Bentley 4½ Litre automobiles from this inter-war period – the "Belle Époque" of the automobile for some  – sold for around €1,000,000. Blowers can fetch more than €7 million and are coveted by collectors despite never winning a single race. For many, the 4½ Litre is to automobiles what the Spitfire is to aircraft.

Popular culture 

AC/DC singer and car enthusiast Brian Johnson cited the 4½ Litre Le Mans as the best he'd driven: "The first time I saw it, everything went north on us, except me jaw – that went south. I just had to have it. That car, I think, is a masterpiece… [It] was ludicrously expensive – I mean, just crackers."

Ian Fleming's character James Bond drives a 1930 Blower Bentley in three of the 007 Novels, Casino Royale, Live and Let Die and Moonraker. In the books, Bond drives one of the last Blower Bentleys built, a battleship grey Convertible Coupé, with French Marchal headlamps.

Notes

References

External links

 Slides easily into Auckland traffic flow (replica of a Birkin Team car
 The original coupé body of the 1931 supercharged Engine MS3948, Chassis MS3946, Reg GY 3905 in the gallery above in 1959

4
Cars introduced in 1926
24 Hours of Le Mans race cars
Le Mans winning cars